Michael Lee Dean (born in Dallas, Texas) is an American clarinetist and university professor.

He studied at the University of Texas at Arlington, the University of Colorado at Boulder, and Texas Tech University. He teaches at the Earl and Margie Holland School of Visual and Performing Arts at Southeast Missouri State University. He has performed and taught at a number of institutions in the United States and England including the Royal Northern College of Music, the Eastman School of Music, California State University Northridge, California State University Long Beach, and the University of North Texas. Michael Dean has lectured at the Clarinet Fest, Music Educators National Convention, and  the Texas Music Educators National Association clinic and convention. He is the president of the National Association of Collegiate  Wind and Percussion Instructors (NACWPI).

Discography
 Desertscape: New Music for Clarinet
 Red Mesa Trio, LMB Resources, 2000.

Books and articles
 Clarinet on Campus
 Preparation and Effort: Tips on Applying John Wooden's Concepts, NACWPI Journal, 2009.
 Business Masterclass: Applying to Graduate School, Windplayer Magazine.
 Building ARTC Musicians Approach, in the column It Works for Me, Southwestern Musician.

External links
Michael Dean Home Page

American clarinetists
Living people
Musicians from Dallas
Year of birth missing (living people)
University of Texas at Arlington alumni
University of Colorado alumni
Texas Tech University alumni
Southeast Missouri State University faculty
21st-century clarinetists